WCDW (106.7 MHz) is a commercial FM radio station licensed to Port Dickinson, New York and serving the Greater Binghamton radio market. The station is owned by Equinox Broadcasting and broadcasts a classic hits radio format.  

WCDW has an effective radiated power (ERP) of 1,200 watts.  The transmitter is in the Ingraham Hill tower farm, south of Binghamton. It also has FM translators at 101.1 in Endwell, New York (relays the main station), 104.5 in Binghamton, New York (relays HD2), 92.9 in Endicott, New York (relays HD3), and 107.1 in Johnson City, New York (relays HD4).

History
The original call sign was WRRQ ("Q107"). Owned by Equinox Broadcasting, it paired up with an oldies station, WCDW Cool 100, from studios on Upper Court Street in the city of Binghamton. The station ran automated, without any regular on-air staff for several months.

Q107 began broadcasting the local AHL hockey team, the Binghamton Senators, for the 2006-07 season.  Justin (Case) MacGregor became the station's first on-air personality, hosting a live pregame show called "Hockey Night In Binghamton" prior to every Saturday night home game.  The Senators did not return to the station for the 2007-08 season.

In February 2007, Tejay Schwartz, a veteran of the Binghamton radio market, became the first morning drive time DJ on Q107. He was joined a month later by radio veterans Steve Shimer (Shimes) on middays and Justin (Case) MacGregor on afternoon drive.  In September 2007, Q107 added a contemporary Christian rock show on Sunday mornings from 7 till 9am.

In December 2007, Tejay left the lineup to rejoin a station across town. Justin shifted to morning drive while Amy Love was added for afternoon drive.

In October 2008, the schedule adjusted again, as Thunder Reynolds joined the staff from crosstown station WAAL for afternoons from 1-4pm.  Also added was Josh Evans, who hosted nights from 9pm till midnight.

Q106.7's format was a blend of up-tempo hits of the 1980s, 1990s and 2000s, using the slogan "The 80's And More".

On June 18, 2013, WRRQ switched to a simulcast of classic hits-formatted WCDW 100.5 FM.

On August 16, 2013 WRRQ changed its call letters to WCDW, after 100.5-FM changed its call sign to WDRE, flipping to Alternative Rock.

WCDW is part of the Southern Tier Radio Network, which includes 100.5 The Drive (WDRE) and 95 The Met (WMTT) in Elmira.

On February 2, 2022, WCDW's HD4 subchannel changed its format from soft adult contemporary as "Sunny 107.1" to classic country as "107.1 The Bear".

Translators

Former stations on this frequency
There was another station that was a low-powered FM station on WCDW's frequency of 106.7 in the Binghamton area. Owego-based WFEM-LPFM  lost its license in 2007 and ceased operations. Because of this, WRRQ signed on from a location in Windsor, New York, significantly to the east of Binghamton, to allow WFEM to continue operating. (other reasons being that it is slightly easier to get a license in an outlying suburb than it is in a heavily media-saturated city, and the area east of Binghamton has comparatively little radio coverage). The station moved to its current location over the course of the year 2010.

On-air line up

Weekdays
Shimes in the Mornings... 6am - 10am
Judith Gross - Middays 10am - 2pm
Thunder Reynolds - 2:00pm – 6:00pm
Dave Pal - 10pm till midnight

Shows
Bill Flynn Polka Show - Sundays 6am till 11am

References

External links

Translator data
 
 
 
 
 
 
 
 

RRQ
Classic hits radio stations in the United States
Radio stations established in 2006
2006 establishments in New York (state)